Martin John Krug (10 September 1888 – 27 June 1966) was a major league infielder with the Boston Red Sox (1912) and Chicago Cubs (1922).  Born Martin Johannes Krieg in Koblenz, German Empire, his parents immigrated to the United States, and he was raised in Cleveland, Ohio.  He was a backup shortstop for the 1912 World Series champion Red Sox, but had little opportunity to play behind starter Heinie Wagner.  He was primarily a third baseman for the 1922 Cubs.

References

External links

1888 births
1966 deaths
Boston Red Sox players
Chicago Cubs players
Columbia Commies players
Columbia Gamecocks players
Detroit Tigers scouts
German emigrants to the United States
Indianapolis Indians players
Los Angeles Angels (minor league) managers
Los Angeles Angels (minor league) players
Major League Baseball players from Germany
Major League Baseball third basemen
Omaha Rourkes players
Sportspeople from Koblenz
People from the Rhine Province
Philadelphia Phillies scouts
Portland Beavers players
Richmond Pioneers players
Salt Lake City Bees players
UCLA Bruins baseball coaches